The Republic of Mountainous Armenia ( Leřnahayastani Hanrapetutyun), also known as simply Mountainous Armenia ( Leřnahayastan), was an anti-Bolshevik Armenian state roughly corresponding with the territory that is now the present-day Armenian provinces of Vayots Dzor and Syunik, and some parts of the present-day Republic of Azerbaijan (in particular, Nakhchivan Autonomous Republic) in the west. It was established by military commander and Armenian political thinker Garegin Nzhdeh and his allies with the support of local guerrilla forces, following  the suppression of the February Uprising in April 1921. It was not recognized by any country but existed until mid-July of the same year.

Background

Post World War I
Following World War I, the signing of the Treaty of Sèvres, and in the ensuing peace negotiations in Paris, the Allies had vowed to punish the Young Turks and reward some, if not all, of the eastern provinces of the empire to the nascent Armenian Republic. However, the Allies were more concerned with concluding the peace treaties with Germany and the other European members of the Central Powers. In matters related to the Near East, the principal western powers, Great Britain, France, Italy and the United States, had conflicting interests over the spheres of influence they were to assume. While there were crippling internal disputes between the Allies, the United States was reluctant to accept a mandate over Armenia. Meanwhile, the recently formed Russian Soviet Federative Socialist Republic and Turkish National Movement had both set their sights on taking over the Caucasus, including Armenia. The Bolsheviks sympathized with the Turkish Movement due to their mutual opposition to the western powers, or "Western Imperialism," as the Bolsheviks referred to it. The Soviet government allied with the Turkish nationalists and sent them gold and weapons. This proved disastrous for the Armenians, and eventually Western Armenia fell to the invading forces.

Sovietization of Armenia

Armenia gave way to communist power in late 1920. The Soviet 11th Red Army's invasion of the First Republic of Armenia started on the 29 November 1920. The actual transfer of power took place on December 2 in Yerevan, when the Armenian leadership approved an ultimatum presented to it by the Soviet plenipotentiary Boris Legran. Armenia agreed to join the Soviet sphere, while Soviet Russia agreed to protect its remaining territory from the advancing Turkish army. The Soviets also pledged to take steps to rebuild the army, to protect the Armenians and not to persecute non-communists, although the final condition of this pledge was reneged when the Dashnaks were forced out of the country. The Soviet Government proposed the annexation of the Nagorno-Karabagh and Syunik regions of Armenia to Soviet Azerbaijan. This step was strongly rejected by Garegin Nzhdeh, who declared Syunik as a self-governing region on December 25, 1920. In January 1921 Drastamat Kanayan sent a telegram to Nzhdeh, suggesting allowing the sovietisation of Syunik, through which they could gain the support of the Bolshevik government in solving the problems of the Armenian lands. Nzhdeh did not depart from Syunik and continued his struggle against the Red Army and Soviet Azerbaijan.

Declaration

On 18 February 1921, the ARF led an anti-Soviet rebellion in Yerevan and seized power. The ARF controlled Yerevan and the surrounding regions for almost 42 days before being defeated by the numerically superior Red Army troops later in April 1921. The leaders of the rebellion then retreated into the Syunik region.

On 26 April 1921, the 2nd Pan-Zangezurian congress, held in Tatev monastery, announced the independence of the self-governing regions of Daralakyaz (Vayots Dzor), Zangezur, and Mountainous Artsakh, under the name of the Republic of Mountainous Armenia and later on 1 June 1921, it was renamed the Republic of Armenia.

Policies
The city of Goris became the capital of the unrecognized state, and Garegin Nzhdeh was chosen as prime minister and minister of defence. Later, in July, Simon Vratsian took the office as prime minister while Nzhdeh became the governor and the general commander.

In 1920-21, With an Armenian Citizen Army of around 15,000 General Nzhdeh and his highly motivated soldiers inflicted heavy casualties upon the invading Kemalist Turkish Army of over 100,000 coming from the West (Ankara) and The Soviet Red Army with over 150,000 forces coming from the East (Baku).

General Nzhdeh positioned his units in such strategic places around the Northern, Western and Eastern borders of Syunik and succeeded in stalling both armies for over seven months causing great international embarrassment for Moscow and Ankara.

A Armenian national hero who is known as the “Savior of Syunik,” Gen. Nzhdeh refused to surrender Syunik to invading Soviet authorities until he secured an international agreement according to which Soviet Kremlin would guarantee the inclusion of Syunik Region in the upcoming Soviet Socialist Republic of Armenia (or Armenian Soviet Socialist Republic — Armenian S.S.R.).

The indomitable spirit of General Nzhdeh and his soldiers averted for Syunik a fate of arbitrary carving and ‘gifting’ to then newly created Azerbaijan Soviet Socialist Republic (Az.S.S.R.). Soviet despot Josef Stalin had earlier dismembered the 1918-1921 First Republic of Armenia. As northern Armenia and the Armenian territories of Artsakh and Nakhichevan had already fallen under Soviet occupation, Soviet Armenia was arbitrarily dismembered. 

Under Stalin, Artsakh and Nakhichevan were carved out and 'gifted' to Azerbaijan. General Nzhdeh categorically refused to let Syunik Region (southern Armenia connecting to Iran) to face a similar fate.

Between April and July 1921, the Red Army conducted massive military operations in the region, attacking Syunik from the north and east. But to no avail. After months of fierce battles with the Red Army, the Republic of Mountainous Armenia forced Soviet Kremlin in July 1921 to promise IN WRITING "to keep the mountainous region of Syunik as a part of Soviet Armenia. After the agreement was signed in Switzerland, Gen. Nzhdeh, his soldiers, and many prominent Armenian intellectuals, including leaders of the First Republic of Armenia, crossed the border into neighboring city of Tabriz in Iran.

See also
 History of Nagorno-Karabakh
 List of historical unrecognized states and dependencies

References

Հայոց Գաղափարաբանության Հենասյուները from noravank.am
Other Armenian States from freenet.am

1921 establishments in Armenia
1921 disestablishments in Armenia
20th century in Armenia
Former republics
States and territories established in 1921
States and territories disestablished in 1921
History of the Republic of Artsakh
Former unrecognized countries
Post–Russian Empire states